Jesús Castillo Aguilera (June 17, 1944 – January 15, 2013) was a Mexican professional boxer. Better known as Chucho Castillo, he was the Lineal, WBA and WBC bantamweight world champion in 1970.

Castillo and Rubén Olivares sustained one of the most important rivalries in the history of Mexican boxing. Castillo was described by the boxing book The Ring: Boxing In The 20th Century as quiet and sullen, while Olivares was more of an outgoing partygoer, according to the book. The personality contrast made fans very interested in their matches.

Early career
Castillo was born in Nuevo Valle de Moreno, a small town in the municipality of León, Guanajuato, Mexico.  He made his professional debut on 26 April 1962 against Carlos Navarrete, suffering his first loss by a decision after six rounds. His next bout was his first win, outpointing Arnulfo Daza in eight rounds. Castillo built a record of 24 wins and 7 losses, with 11 knockout wins, before facing José Medel for the Mexican Bantamweight title on 29 April 1967. He won the title on points after the twelve rounds, retaining it twice and also winning an additional seven non-title bouts before his first world title challenge. Among the fighters he beat during that streak were Jesus Pimentel and Memo Tellez, who had beaten Castillo twice before.

Lineal, WBC & WBA Bantamweight Championship
Castillo made his first world title attempt against Australia's Lionel Rose, the first Aborigine ever to win a world title. The fight was held on 6 December 1968 at the Forum in Inglewood, where Rose won a very unpopular fifteen-round decision in front of a decidedly pro-Castillo crowd, causing a riot. Castillo had eight bouts in 1969, going 5-1-2 during that period. He beat future world champion Rafael Herrera to defend his Mexican title, had a ten-round draw in Tokyo with Ushiwakamaru Harada, drew with Medel, and split two decisions with Raul Cruz.

Castillo vs. Olivares
In 1970, Castillo was given a second world title chance when he and Olivares clashed to begin their three fight rivalry, with all three fights taking place at the Forum in Inglewood. On 18 April, Olivares retained the crown by outpointing over Castillo. However, a rematch between the two fighters took place on 16 October. Castillo cut Olivares in round one, and when it was determined that Olivares could not continue in Round 14, Castillo was declared winner by a technical knockout, winning the world bantamweight championship. After one non-title win, Castillo met Olivares for a third time on 3 April 1971, when Olivares recovered the crown by outpointing Castillo despite suffering an early knockdown.

Later in career
Castillo went on fighting until 1975, but his record from the third Olivares fight until his retirement was a rather ordinary one of 5 wins and 7 losses. He lost to former or future world champions Enrique Pinder, Bobby Chacon, and Danny "Little Red" Lopez. After losing to Ernesto Herrera on 12 December 1975, he retired.

Professional boxing record 

|- style="margin:0.5em auto; font-size:95%;"
| style="text-align:center;" colspan="8"|47 Wins (23 knockouts, 23 decisions, 1 disqualification), 17 Losses (6 knockouts, 11 decisions), 2 Draws
|- style="text-align:center; margin:0.5em auto; font-size:95%; background:#e3e3e3;"
| style="border-style:none none solid solid; "|Res.
| style="border-style:none none solid solid; "|Record
| style="border-style:none none solid solid; "|Opponent
| style="border-style:none none solid solid; "|Type
| style="border-style:none none solid solid; "|Round
| style="border-style:none none solid solid; "|Date
| style="border-style:none none solid solid; "|Location
| style="border-style:none none solid solid; "|Notes
|-align=center
| Loss
|47–17–2
|align=left| Ernesto Herrera
|align=left|PTS
|10
|1975-12-12
|align=left| Laredo
|align=left|
|-align=center
| Loss
|47–16–2
|align=left| Danny Lopez
|align=left|TKO
|2 (10)
|1975-04-24
|align=left| Olympic Auditorium, Los Angeles
|align=left|
|-align=center
| Win
|47–15–2
|align=left| Rafael Ortega
|align=left|UD
|10
|1974-09-14
|align=left| Arena México, Mexico City
|align=left|
|-align=center
| Loss
|46–15–2
|align=left| Vicente Blanco
|align=left|PTS
|10
|1974-06-22
|align=left| Estadio Metropolitano, León
|align=left|
|-align=center
| Win
|46–14–2
|align=left| Victor Rodrigo
|align=left|PTS
|10
|1974-05-14
|align=left| Ciudad Juárez
|align=left|
|-align=center
| Loss
|45–14–2
|align=left| Bobby Chacon
|align=left|TKO
|10 (10)
|1973-04-28
|align=left| The Forum, Inglewood
|align=left|
|-align=center
| Loss
|45–13–2
|align=left| Jose Luis Soto
|align=left|PTS
|10
|1973-03-02
|align=left| Culiacán
|align=left|
|-align=center
| Loss
|45–12–2
|align=left| Enrique Pinder
|align=left|MD
|10
|1972-11-14
|align=left| The Forum, Inglewood
|align=left|
|-align=center
| Win
|45–11–2
|align=left| Earl Large
|align=left|UD
|10
|1972-06-06
|align=left| Plaza de Toros, Ciudad Juárez
|align=left|
|-align=center
| Win
|44–11–2
|align=left| Jose Lopez
|align=left|KO
|1 (10)
|1972-01-01
|align=left| Mexico
|align=left|
|-align=center
| Loss
|43–11–2
|align=left| Rafael Herrera
|align=left|SD
|12
|1971-08-23
|align=left| The Forum, Inglewood
|align=left|For NABF bantamweight title.
|-align=center
| Win
|43–10–2
|align=left| Earl Large
|align=left|PTS
|10
|1971-08-04
|align=left| Ciudad Juárez
|align=left|
|-align=center
| Loss
|42–10–2
|align=left| Rubén Olivares
|align=left|UD
|15
|1971-04-02
|align=left| The Forum, Inglewood
|align=left|Lost WBA, WBC, The Ring, and lineal bantamweight titles.
|-align=center
| Win
|42–9–2
|align=left| Felipe Ursua
|align=left|TKO
|6 (10)
|1971-02-28
|align=left| Monterrey
|align=left|
|-align=center
| Win
|41–9–2
|align=left| Rubén Olivares
|align=left|TKO
|14 (15)
|1970-10-16
|align=left| The Forum, Inglewood
|align=left|Won WBA, WBC, The Ring, and lineal bantamweight titles.
|-align=center
| Win
|40–9–2
|align=left| Rogelio Lara
|align=left|UD
|12
|1970-08-14
|align=left| The Forum, Inglewood
|align=left|Won inaugural NABF bantamweight title. Castillo later vacated the title.
|-align=center
| Loss
|39–9–2
|align=left| Rubén Olivares
|align=left|UD
|15
|1970-04-18
|align=left| The Forum, Inglewood
|align=left|For WBA, WBC, The Ring, and lineal bantamweight titles.
|-align=center
| Win
|39–8–2
|align=left| Raul Cruz
|align=left|UD
|10
|1969-12-12
|align=left| The Forum, Inglewood
|align=left|Originally a 12-round title eliminator, but Cruz missed weight.
|-align=center
| Loss
|38–8–2
|align=left| Raul Cruz
|align=left|MD
|12
|1969-10-17
|align=left| The Forum, Inglewood
|align=left|Originally a title eliminator bout, but a rematch was booked instead.
|-align=center
| Draw
|38–7–2
|align=left| José Medel
|align=left|PTS
|12
|1969-09-30
|align=left| Ciudad Juárez
|align=left|Retained Mexican bantamweight title.
|-align=center
| Win
|38–7–1
|align=left| Alberto Jangalay
|align=left|TKO
|5 (10)
|1969-07-26
|align=left| Arena México, Mexico City
|align=left|
|-align=center
| Win
|37–7–1
|align=left| Ernie Cruz
|align=left|KO
|5 (10)
|1969-06-29
|align=left| Plaza de Toros México, Mexico City
|align=left|
|-align=center
| Win
|36–7–1
|align=left| Seiichi Watanuki
|align=left|KO
|4 (10)
|1969-06-10
|align=left| Plaza de Toros, Ciudad Juárez
|align=left|
|-align=center
| Draw
|35–7–1
|align=left| Ushiwakamaru Harada
|align=left|MD
|10
|1969-04-16
|align=left| Tokyo
|align=left|
|-align=center
| Win
|35–7
|align=left| Rafael Herrera
|align=left|TKO
|3 (12)
|1969-02-15
|align=left| Plaza de Toros Monumental, Monterrey
|align=left|Retained Mexican bantamweight title.
|-align=center
| Loss
|34–7
|align=left| Lionel Rose
|align=left|SD
|15
|1968-12-06
|align=left| The Forum, Inglewood
|align=left|For WBA, WBC, The Ring, and lineal bantamweight titles.
|-align=center
| Win
|34–6
|align=left| Evan Armstrong
|align=left|TKO
|2 (10)
|1968-08-28
|align=left| The Forum, Inglewood
|align=left|
|-align=center
| Win
|33–6
|align=left| Jesús Pimentel
|align=left|UD
|12
|1968-06-14
|align=left| The Forum, Inglewood
|align=left|WBA, WBC, The Ring, and lineal bantamweight titles eliminator.
|-align=center
| Win
|32–6
|align=left| Guillermo Tellez
|align=left|TKO
|11 (12)
|1968-05-14
|align=left| Ciudad Juárez
|align=left|Retained Mexican bantamweight title.
|-align=center
| Win
|31–6
|align=left| Yoshio Nakane
|align=left|UD
|12
|1968-03-31
|align=left| Plaza de Toros, Ciudad Juárez
|align=left|
|-align=center
| Win
|30–6
|align=left| Jose Valdez
|align=left|PTS
|10
|1968-03-06
|align=left| León
|align=left|
|-align=center
| Win
|29–6
|align=left| Miguel Castro
|align=left|TKO
|6 (12)
|1967-11-26
|align=left| Ciudad Juárez
|align=left|Retained Mexican bantamweight title.
|-align=center
| Win
|28–6
|align=left| Bernardo Caraballo
|align=left|RTD
|7 (10)
|1967-10-14
|align=left| Estadio Azteca, Mexico City
|align=left|
|-align=center
| Win
|27–6
|align=left| Pornchai Poprai-ngam
|align=left|KO
|5 (10)
|1967-08-14
|align=left| Tijuana
|align=left|
|-align=center
| Win
|26–6
|align=left| José Medel
|align=left|UD
|12
|1967-04-29
|align=left| Arena México, Mexico City
|align=left|Won Mexican bantamweight title.
|-align=center
| Win
|25–6
|align=left| Miguel Castro
|align=left|PTS
|10
|1966-12-17
|align=left| El Toreo de Cuatro Caminos, Mexico City
|align=left|
|-align=center
| Win
|24–6
|align=left| Waldemiro Pinto
|align=left|KO
|3 (10)
|1966-11-13
|align=left| Plaza de Toros, Ciudad Juárez
|align=left|
|-align=center
| Win
|23–6
|align=left| Jerry Stokes
|align=left|KO
|2 (10)
|1966-08-27
|align=left| Mexico City
|align=left|
|-align=center
| Win
|22–6
|align=left| Edmundo Esparza
|align=left|TKO
|3 (10)
|1966-07-27
|align=left| Plaza de Toros, Ciudad Juárez
|align=left|
|-align=center
| Loss
|21–6
|align=left| Guillermo Tellez
|align=left|TKO
|6 (10)
|1966-06-06
|align=left| Mexico City
|align=left|
|-align=center
| Win
|21–5
|align=left| Jesus Hernandez
|align=left|TKO
|7 (10)
|1966-05-22
|align=left| Mexico City
|align=left|
|-align=center
| Loss
|20–5
|align=left| Miguel Castro
|align=left|TKO
|5 (10)
|1966-03-19
|align=left| Mexico City
|align=left|
|-align=center
| Win
|20–4
|align=left| Lenny Brice
|align=left|PTS
|10
|1965-11-20
|align=left| Arena Coliseo, Guadalajara
|align=left|
|-align=center
| Loss
|19–4
|align=left| Guillermo Tellez
|align=left|TKO
|5 (10)
|1965-09-25
|align=left| Arena Coliseo, Mexico City
|align=left|
|-align=center
| Win
|19–3
|align=left| Jesus Hernandez
|align=left|TKO
|6 (10)
|1965-08-07
|align=left| Mexico City
|align=left|
|-align=center
| Win
|18–3
|align=left| Edmundo Esparza
|align=left|TKO
|2 (10)
|1965-06-15
|align=left| Plaza de Toros, Ciudad Juárez
|align=left|
|-align=center
| Win
|17–3
|align=left| Daniel Valdez
|align=left|PTS
|10
|1965-03-24
|align=left| Arena Coliseo, Mexico City
|align=left|
|-align=center
| Win
|16–3
|align=left| Goyo Sanchez
|align=left|KO
|1 (10)
|1965-03-03
|align=left| Mexico City
|align=left|
|-align=center
| Win
|15–3
|align=left| Salvador Reyes
|align=left|PTS
|4
|1964-11-25
|align=left| Arena Puebla, Puebla
|align=left|
|-align=center
| Loss
|14–3
|align=left| Jose Gonzalez
|align=left|TD
|7 (10)
|1964-11-11
|align=left| Mexico City
|align=left|
|-align=center
| Loss
|14–2
|align=left| Zorrito Castanon
|align=left|TKO
|10 (10)
|1964-10-17
|align=left| Oaxaca City
|align=left|
|-align=center
| Win
|14–1
|align=left| Adalberto Martinez
|align=left|TKO
|8 (10)
|1964-09-30
|align=left| Mexico City
|align=left|
|-align=center
| Win
|13–1
|align=left| Genaro Gaytan
|align=left|PTS
|10
|1964-07-08
|align=left| Mexico City
|align=left|
|-align=center
| Win
|12–1
|align=left| Emiliano Olvera
|align=left|PTS
|10
|1964-06-13
|align=left| Mexico City
|align=left|
|-align=center
| Win
|11–1
|align=left| Jose Gonzalez
|align=left|TKO
|8 (10)
|1964-05-23
|align=left| Mexico City
|align=left|
|-align=center
| Win
|10–1
|align=left| Samuel Castillo
|align=left|PTS
|8
|1964-03-18
|align=left| Mexico City
|align=left|
|-align=center
| Win
|9–1
|align=left| Chucho Cardenas
|align=left|DQ
|3 (8)
|1964-01-01
|align=left| Acapulco
|align=left|
|-align=center
| Win
|8–1
|align=left| Juan Carlos Villanueva
|align=left|PTS
|8
|1963-11-21
|align=left| Mexico
|align=left|
|-align=center
| Win
|7–1
|align=left| Felipe Silva
|align=left|PTS
|6
|1963-10-20
|align=left| Mexico City
|align=left|
|-align=center
| Win
|6–1
|align=left| Catarino Lopez
|align=left|PTS
|6
|1963-09-14
|align=left| Mexico City
|align=left|
|-align=center
| Win
|5–1
|align=left| Samuel Castillo
|align=left|TKO
|9 (10)
|1963-09-02
|align=left| Oaxaca City
|align=left|
|-align=center
| Win
|4–1
|align=left| Eduardo Torres
|align=left|PTS
|6
|1963-06-12
|align=left| Mexico City
|align=left|
|-align=center
| Win
|3–1
|align=left| Pichon Contreras
|align=left|KO
|10 (10)
|1963-03-02
|align=left| Oaxaca City
|align=left|
|-align=center
| Win
|2–1
|align=left| Zurdo Suarez
|align=left|PTS
|10
|1962-10-20
|align=left| Oaxaca City
|align=left|
|-align=center
| Win
|1–1
|align=left| Arnulfo Daza
|align=left|PTS
|8
|1962-08-11
|align=left| Oaxaca City
|align=left|
|-align=center
| Loss
|0–1
|align=left| Carlos Navarrete
|align=left|PTS
|6
|1962-04-25
|align=left| Mexico City
|align=left|
|-align=center

See also
List of WBC world champions
List of WBA world champions
List of bantamweight boxing champions
List of Mexican boxing world champions
List of undisputed world boxing champions

References

External links

Chucho Castillo - CBZ Profile

|-

|-

|-

|-

1944 births
2013 deaths
Sportspeople from León, Guanajuato
Boxers from Guanajuato
Bantamweight boxers
World boxing champions
World bantamweight boxing champions
World Boxing Association champions
World Boxing Council champions
Mexican male boxers